Statistics of Nemzeti Bajnokság I in the 1957 season.

Overview
It was contested by 12 teams, and Vasas SC won the championship.

League standings

Results

Statistical leaders

Top goalscorers

References
Hungary - List of final tables (RSSSF)

Nemzeti Bajnokság I seasons
1957–58 in Hungarian football
1956–57 in Hungarian football
Hun
Hun